Dissonidae is a family of crustaceans belonging to the order Siphonostomatoida.

Genera:
 Dissonus Wilson, 1906
 Innaprokofevnas Kazatchenko, 2001

References

Siphonostomatoida